The 1991 Tour of Britain was the fifth edition of the Kellogg's Tour of Britain cycle race and was held from 6 August to 10 August 1991. The race started in Windsor and finished in Leeds. The race was won by Phil Anderson of the Motorola team.

Route

General classification

References

1991
Tour of Britain
Tour of Britain
Tour of Britain